Pendleton Sixth Form College is a further education college in Salford, Greater Manchester. It offers A-levels and vocational courses. The college was established nearly half a century ago from Salford Grammar School for Boys, Pendleton High School for Girls and De La Salle College.

References

Education in Salford
Further education colleges in Greater Manchester
Educational institutions established in 2009
2009 establishments in England